RemoSync (also named Corporate Email on Verizon) is a mobile application that provides corporate email, calendar, and contact synchronization for mobile phones capable of running BREW applications. Conceived as a low-cost alternative to BlackBerry or iPhone devices, RemoSync is currently available on the Verizon wireless network.

RemoSync 3.0 and later versions are named as Corporate Email by Verizon Wireless. RemoSync and 'Corporate Email' refer to the same product.

The RemoSync team released a new version of 4.0 in May 2010. The first device that has 4.0 is Samsung Reality SCH-U820. RemoSync 4.0 is available on multiple handsets.

RemoSync was developed by Remoba, Inc.⁣, a software firm in Hayward, California. Remoba earlier was located in Santa Clara, California but Relocated to Hayward in 2009 Q4.

RemoSync or Corporate Email releases

Corporate Email 4.0
Corporate Email 4.0 is officially released in May 2010. This version brings significant changes compared to the earlier release 3.0. This product virtually supports emails from all major email solution providers.
Microsoft Exchange Server
IBM Lotus Notes
Google Apps
Gmail
IMAP Accounts
POP Accounts
zimbra

Uses Microsoft Exchange ActiveSync to sync email, contacts & calendars from Microsoft Exchange Server, IBM Lotus Notes, and Zimbra. Google account uses ActiveSync to sync contacts and calendars, whereas email is synced using IMAP Push. This version supports IMAP push.

Some key changes are:
 Supports access from Microsoft Exchange Server 2010.
 Supports multiple accounts. Users can add GOOGLE / LOTUS / IMAP / POP more than one.
 Supports Lotus Notes Accounts. Email, contacts, and Calendar are synced using ActiveSync protocols.
 Supports Google business accounts. Email is synced using IMAP PUSH, contacts, and calendar using ActiveSync.
 Allows configuring POP / IMAP accounts.
 IMAP Push is supported.
 Icon-based main menu.
 Recurring events and tasks are supported.
 Revised UIs – The UI is completely rewritten with 4.0 versions.
 Contacts database is maintained with the application.
 Connects and syncs from Exchange Server even when non-provisional devices are blocked.

Criticism

Advantages
 RemoSync operates on a variety of low-to-mid-range handsets.
 No additional server infrastructure is required. Back-end implementation is via Microsoft Exchange Server Mobile Policy Settings.
 Data transmission is encrypted with SSL.
 RemoSync implements all mobile security features available on Microsoft Exchange.
 RemoSync 3.0 and later versions support viewing attachments on phone. Supports viewing DOC, Excel, PDF, PPT, and images (GIF, JPEG, TIFF, BMP, PNG). Microsoft Office and PDF documents are displayed page-by-page images. This is a big plus knowing the devices do not support any viewer.

Disadvantages
 Service must be offered by the wireless carrier. Currently only Verizon wireless enables RemoSync.
 Only available for companies running Microsoft Exchange Server or those using a hosted Exchange solution.
 The 4.0 version maintains the application-specific contacts database. Remoba says this is done to prevent unauthorized access to corporate contacts.

Notable devices on Verizon using RemoSync (or Corporate Email)
 LG enV Touch (VX11000)
 LG enV3 (VX9200)
 Samsung Reality SCH-U820
 Samsung SCH-U960 (Rogue)
 Casio Hitachi Brigade C741
 Casio Hitachi Rock C731
 LG Dare
 Samsung Alias 2

For a complete list, check the Verizon pages for 'RemoSync' and 'Corporate Email' in the reference section.

See also
 Mobile Internet Device (MID)
 Personal Digital Assistant (PDA)
 Push e-mail
 Smartphone

References

Wireless email